In mathematics, a Cunningham chain is a certain sequence of prime numbers. Cunningham chains are named after mathematician A. J. C. Cunningham. They are also called chains of nearly doubled primes.

Definition

A Cunningham chain of the first kind of length n is a sequence of prime numbers (p1, ..., pn) such that pi+1 = 2pi + 1 for all 1 ≤ i < n. (Hence each term of such a chain except the last is a Sophie Germain prime, and each term except the first is a safe prime).

It follows that

 

or, by setting  (the number  is not part of the sequence and need not be a prime number), we have 

Similarly, a Cunningham chain of the second kind of length n is a sequence of prime numbers (p1, ..., pn) such that pi+1 = 2pi − 1 for all 1 ≤ i < n.

It follows that the general term is

 

Now, by setting , we have .

Cunningham chains are also sometimes generalized to sequences of prime numbers (p1, ..., pn) such that pi+1 = api + b for all 1 ≤ i ≤ n for fixed coprime integers a and b; the resulting chains are called generalized Cunningham chains.

A Cunningham chain is called complete if it cannot be further extended, i.e., if the previous and the next terms in the chain are not prime numbers.

Examples

Examples of complete Cunningham chains of the first kind include these:

 2, 5, 11, 23, 47 (The next number would be 95, but that is not prime.)
 3, 7 (The next number would be 15, but that is not prime.)
 29, 59 (The next number would be 119 = 7×17, but that is not prime.)
 41, 83, 167 (The next number would be 335, but that is not prime.)
 89, 179, 359, 719, 1439, 2879 (The next number would be 5759 = 13×443, but that is not prime.)

Examples of complete Cunningham chains of the second kind include these:

 2, 3, 5 (The next number would be 9, but that is not prime.)
 7, 13 (The next number would be 25, but that is not prime.)
 19, 37, 73 (The next number would be 145, but that is not prime.)
 31, 61 (The next number would be 121 = 112, but that is not prime.)

Cunningham chains are now considered useful in cryptographic systems since "they provide two concurrent suitable settings for the ElGamal cryptosystem ... [which] can be implemented in any field where the discrete logarithm problem is difficult."

Largest known Cunningham chains 

It follows from Dickson's conjecture and the broader Schinzel's hypothesis H, both widely believed to be true, that for every k there are infinitely many Cunningham chains of length k.  There are, however, no known direct methods of generating such chains.

There are computing competitions for the longest Cunningham chain or for the one built up of the largest primes, but unlike the breakthrough of Ben J. Green and Terence Tao – the Green–Tao theorem, that there are arithmetic progressions of primes of arbitrary length – there is no general result known on large Cunningham chains to date.

q# denotes the primorial 2 × 3 × 5 × 7 × ... × q.

, the longest known Cunningham chain of either kind is of length 19, discovered by Jaroslaw Wroblewski in 2014.

Congruences of Cunningham chains 

Let the odd prime  be the first prime of a Cunningham chain of the first kind. The first prime is odd, thus . Since each successive prime in the chain is  it follows that . Thus, and so forth.

The above property can be informally observed by considering the primes of a chain in base 2. (Note that, as with all bases, multiplying by the base "shifts" the digits to the left; e.g. in decimal we have 314 × 10 = 3140.) When we consider   in base 2, we see that, by multiplying   by 2, the least significant digit of   becomes the secondmost least significant digit of  . Because  is odd—that is, the least significant digit is 1 in base 2–we know that the secondmost least significant digit of   is also 1. In this way, successive primes in a Cunningham chain are essentially shifted left in binary with ones filling in the least significant digits. For example, here is a complete length 6 chain which starts at 141361469:

A similar result holds for Cunningham chains of the second kind. From the observation that  and the relation  it follows that . As with Cunningham chains of the first kind, the bits left of the pattern shift left by one position with each successive prime.

Similarly, because  it follows that . But, by Fermat's little theorem, so  divides  (i.e. with ). Thus, no Cunningham chain can be of infinite length.

See also 
 Primecoin, which uses Cunningham chains as a proof-of-work system
 Bi-twin chain
 Primes in arithmetic progression

References

External links 
 The Prime Glossary: Cunningham chain
 Primecoin discoveries (primes.zone): online database of primecoin findings with list of records and visualization
 PrimeLinks++: Cunningham chain
  -- the first term of the lowest complete Cunningham chains of the first kind of length n, for 1 ≤ n ≤ 14
  -- the first term of the lowest complete Cunningham chains of the second kind with length n, for 1 ≤ n ≤ 15

Prime numbers